Dr. George Sumner Huntington (March 21, 1861 – January 5, 1927) was a medical doctor, a researcher into comparative anatomy, and a college professor.  For thirty-five years he was a professor of anatomy at the Columbia University College of Physicians and Surgeons.

He had attended the college he taught at and graduated in 1897 with honors, winning 1st place in both the Harsen prize for Clinical Reports and for Proficiency in Examination.  Among other degrees he received was an honorary Bachelor of Laws from Jefferson Medical College in 1907.

References

External links 
 
 Biographical memoir from the United States National Academy of Sciences

1861 births
1927 deaths
American anatomists
American print editors